Hasan Bin Uthman (/ʿuthmān/; Arabic: حسن بن عثمان; born on 12 February 1959) is a Tunisian writer and journalist. He was born in the town of Skalba, Menzel Temime, Nabeul Governorate.

Career 
He began his career in the 1980s with many opposing and independent stances and contributed to articles in several Arab newspapers and magazines such as Kul al-Arab that issues in Paris and Kuwait's Al-Qabas. He founded and supervised the establishment of several cultural pages and supplements in the weekly newspaper Al-Mustaqbal and the weekly supplement of "Cultural Papers" (original title: Waraqāt Thaqāfīyah). He was the editor-in-chief of the cultural section of the newspaper AlRay AlAam in 1993.

He then joined the Ministry of Culture of Tunisia and became the editor-in-chief of its cultural magazine "Cultural Life" (original title: al-Ḥayāt al-Thaqāfīyah) from 1996 to 2006.

Post-Revolution 
He was known for the saying "Ben Ali is dead" which he uttered during a show that aired on the Tunisie 7 (now called El Watania 1) on 4 January 2011. After the revolution, he participated in several Tunisian TV shows including "To Who Dares Only" (original title: Li-man Yajruʾ Faqat) and “Screen Monster” (original title: Waḥsh al-Shāshah) with the media figure Samir ElWafi. He was known for many interferences that later remained in the watchers’ minds.

Works 

 1986: "Abbas Loses His Mind" (original title: ʿAbbās Yafqid al-Ṣawāb)
 1990: "With Abd al-Rahman al-Haila: On Life and Religion" (original title: Maʿ ʿAbd al-Raḥmān al-Hailah: Fī Shuʾūn al-Dīn wa-al-Dunyah)
 1991: "Neither Above the Ground, nor Below" (original title: Lā Fawqa al-Arḍ, Lā Taḥtahā)
 1998: "Promosport: The Five Ground Rules to Win the Sports Betting" (original title: Brūmūsbūr: al-Qawāʿid al-Khams li-allFawz bi-al-Rihān al-Riyāḍī: Riwāyah)
 2000: "Night of the Nights" (original title: Laylat al-Layālī)
 2002: "Two Sheikhs" (original title: Shaykhān)
 2009: "The Woman and Her Veil", co-written with Raja Ben Slama (original title: al-Marʾah wa-Ḥijābuhā)
 2011: "Bourguiba Children" (original title: Aṭfāl Būrqībah: Riwāyah)
 2014: "The Blue Tale: The Moon Shining on Tunis-Carthage International Airport" (original title: Al-Riwāyah al-Zarqāʾ: Ḥīn Ṭalaʿa al-Badru ʿAlayna fī Maṭār Tūnis Qirṭāj al-Duwalī)
 2017: "The Drunken Tunisia" (original title: Tūnis al-Sakrānah)

Awards 
Hasan Bin Uthman won the COMAR d'Or prize in 1999 for his work "Promosport: The Five Ground Rules to Win the Sports Betting”. It became a film adaptation under the title “The Word of Men" (original title: Kalimat Rijāl) in 2004 which was directed by Moez Kamun.

References 

Tunisian writers
Tunisian journalists
1959 births
Living people